Zheng Xuan (127– July 200), courtesy name Kangcheng, was a Chinese philosopher, politician, and writer near the end of the Eastern Han Dynasty. He was born in Gaomi, Beihai Commandery (modern Weifang, Shandong), and was a student of Ma Rong, together with Lu Zhi.

Like his teacher, he was a member of the Old Text School that was challenging the state orthodox New Text School.  His contemporary rival was He Xiu (129-182).  Zheng is notable for his syncretic attempt to bridge the two centuries of rivalry between the two schools.  He adopted the strengths of each school in the interpretation of the Confucian classics although he usually favored the Old Text teachings.  He was very influential but the government never officially adopted his teachings. The Han Dynasty was already in decline during his lifetime and collapsed a generation after his death. Both schools did not survive the chaos but Zheng's conception of Confucianism would be the mainstream interpretation for centuries.

In 200, during the Battle of Guandu, Zheng was ordered by the warlord Yuan Shao to Yuan's stronghold (in modern-day Daming County, Hebei Province), where he died of illness in July.

The commemorative shrine of Zheng Xuan in Shandong was rebuilt under supervision of Ruan Yuan 阮元 (1764–1849) in 1793.

In Romance of the Three Kingdoms

Zheng Xuan appears in Chapter 22 of the novel Romance of the Three Kingdoms, which dramatises the end of the Han dynasty and the subsequent Three Kingdoms era. Zheng is depicted as living in Xuzhou. Liu Bei asks Zheng to write to Yuan Shao to propose an alliance against Cao Cao.

See also
Three Kingdoms
Lists of people of the Three Kingdoms
Records of the Three Kingdoms
Romance of the Three Kingdoms

References

Citations
 

127 births
200 deaths
2nd-century Chinese philosophers
Chinese Confucianists
Han dynasty essayists
Han dynasty philosophers
Philosophers from Shandong
Writers from Weifang
Han dynasty classicists